Area Resources for Community and Human Services (ARCHS) is a not-for-profit organization that designs, manages, and evaluates education and social service programs. ARCHS leverages financial, human, and social capital resources through collaborative partnerships to improve the lives of youth and families in the St. Louis region. During FY13, ARCHS managed and evaluated 14 programs on behalf of 10 funders. ARCHS is contracted to serve as the official "Community Partnership" for Greater St. Louis on behalf of the State of Missouri – one of 20 similar organizations across Missouri.

About ARCHS
ARCHS does not directly provide programs or services to the general public. Through their funding partners, ARCHS selects service delivery partners that are the most qualified to provide the required services. Currently ARCHS has over 200 service delivery partners around Greater St. Louis and surrounding areas. ARCHS uses a strategic management system that enhances the overall business program of that service delivery partner. 
In an interview with St. Louis Commerce Magazine ARCHS CEO Wendell Kimbrough states “We believe in being accountable, making sure we live up to delivering what our funders have asked and delivering in a timely manner on goals and objectives.” One of ARCHS main goals is to enhance the overall business and program practices of its service delivery partners.

History
Area Resources for Community and Human Services (ARCHS) has a 16-year history of effectively managing programs in order to ensure its funders’ goals and outcomes are met and/or exceeded. Established as a 501(c)(3) not-for-profit organization in 1997, ARCHS is contracted to serve as the official "Community Partnership" for the St. Louis region on behalf of the State of Missouri. ARCHS has a successful history of leveraging more than $200 million in public and private resources. Each year, ARCHS' programs positively impact the lives of thousands of area children and families with a focus on “best practices”. ARCHS has earned many awards and accolades for building collaborative programs – including being named a three-time winner of a “What’s Right With the Region Award” by FOCUS St. Louis® (2004/2012), the “Healthcare Advocacy Organization of the Year” by St. Louis American Foundation (2010), and with a “Distinguished Community Service Award for Education” by Harris-Stowe State University (2011).

ARCHS programs
ARCHS manages many programs that affect the St. Louis region. ARCHS Lifelong Learning philosophy centers around the notion that education is a necessity for success. Furthermore, ARCHS increases the quality of child care and educational programs by providing support to child care programs that are going through the accreditation or reaccreditation process. ARCHS' funded child care programs receiving start up and expansion and accreditation funding. ARCHS provided strategic technical assistance to nine area child care programs that achieved national accreditation.

K-12
Since 2007, After School for All Partnership (ASAP) has provided funding to after school programs and oversees the management of their services. The partnership's plan is to gather diverse funders to pool resources for grants, develop a system for monitoring accountability and evaluation, and to provide quality improvement and professional development. ARCHS currently supports 45 after-school locations. Headed by ASAP, the program includes the addition of 27 new or expanded after school programs at area public and private schools, city recreation centers and community sites serving 1,283 students each school day, according to a release. The program begins this fall.

ARCHS' Kids Vision for Life partnership with Crown Vision Center, Essilor Vision Foundation, Inc., and University of Missouri–St. Louis School of Optometry provides free eye screenings to more than 12,000 children in grades K-6 at Saint Louis Public Schools and other St. Louis area public schools, to provide free eye examinations to students who fail the screening, and provide free eyeglasses to students who need them after completing the eye examination.

From FY09 to FY12, ARCHS' Gang Resistance Education and Training (GREAT) provided school-based, law enforcement officer-instructed classroom curriculum. The program's primary objective was prevention and was intended as immunization against juvenile delinquency, youth violence and gang membership. ARCHS' GREAT served more than 3,100 Jennings School District K-8 students were completed courses taught by area law enforcement officers aimed at improving student life skills and decision making to help reduce impact of gangs and drugs.

In 2010, Missouri Division of Youth Services selected ARCHS to deliver its award-winning Community Mentoring Services Program (CMSP) to youth in the Greater St. Louis area. CMSP's goals are to decrease social isolation and exclusion, increase safety, increase stability and increase the control of choices and the meaningful use of mainstream resources.

Pre-K
From 1997 to 2012, ARCHS supported more than 80 child care centers that included a focus on providing safe environments, developing physical motor skills and healthy eating habits. In addition, ARCHS provided courses taught by nationally trained, local law enforcement officers, which focused on improving youth life skills and decision making to reduce the impact of bullying and drugs through their Gang/Drug Prevention Partnerships. Annually more than 3,000 children received this healthy start and 150 area jobs are impacted. Many of ARCHS’ early childhood standards to increase access and quality were used as models by the state.

The Missouri Department of Social Services Children's Division assigned ARCHS the task of helping to increase the quality of child care and education programs by providing support to child care programs that went through the accreditation or reaccreditation process in the St. Louis region, which also included National Association for the Education of Young Children accreditation. Throughout the program, ARCHS helped more than 50 child care programs with reaccreditation.

In 2009 the state of Missouri requested that ARCHS assume full responsibility for the St. Louis Educare program. Educare serves home-care providers in the Greater St. Louis area. The program focuses on children from the ages of birth to five years of age. The Missouri Department of Social Services, Children's Division supports ARCHS in this effort. Educare is open to registered/unlicensed child care providers who have signed up with the State of Missouri to provide care to four or fewer children. ARCHS' Educare will provide the training and on-site consultation needed to child care providers using the Emotional Beginnings curriculum.

The Missouri Department of Social Services requested ARCHS to assume responsibility of the Home Visitation program, which provides parenting skills education to help reduce child abuse and neglect. ARCHS' program serves more than 50 area families each year (450 over the past 7 years) with no substantiated claims of child abuse or neglect for any families enrolled in ARCHS' HVP. All families report an increased time spent on literacy activities with their children. ARCHS contracts the New Hope Community Center and Jennings School District to provide services in the City of St. Louis and Jennings.

Family and Community
As of 2010 ARCHS partnered with the Environmental Protection Agency to create the St. Louis Area Communities Against Toxics (SLACAT). In 2008 through another EPA grant, ARCHS partnered with the St. Louis College of Pharmacy and the local Schnucks Pharmacy chain to offer an RxMEDS disposal campaign at 20 locations in the greater St. Louis area. Previously, ARCHS assisted the Health and Dental Care for Kids clinic. Through ARCHS, the clinic was able to obtain grants that funded essential positions that otherwise would not have been attainable within their budget. ARCHS provides support to a regional Missouri HealthNet (MHN) education and outreach committee of community volunteers. ARCHS also actively promotes culinary-related careers through its prisoner reentry partnerships.

Since 2002, the Missouri Department of Corrections has worked with several state agencies to develop a model to help ex-offenders while they are in prison and once they are released. This model, called the Missouri Reentry Process, includes job skills training and placement, mental-health referrals, and housing programs. ARCHS provides the management oversight for the St. Louis Alliance For Reentry (STAR), a program that works within the Missouri Reentry Process to provide a pre- and post-release mentoring program that focuses on 18 to 35-year-old nonviolent offenders. The program provides life-skills and job-preparation training, financial literacy and health issues education, as well as emphasizing repairing and strengthening personal relationships. In addition, ARCHS co-sponsors the annual Missouri Reentry Conference with the Missouri Department of Corrections, Missouri Department of Social Services, and Family and Community Trust (FACT) held in Tan-Tar-A Resort in Osage Beach. The conference, which began in 2005, features speakers and workshops concerning issues surrounding Missouri's ex-offender population. The conferences average over 300 attendees annually. The intent of the conference is to provide high-quality education and networking opportunities for corrections professionals and community-based partners involved in the state's reentry process.

ARCHS manages a St. Louis Adult Basketball/Life Skills program that is a partnership with the St. Louis Metropolitan Police Department, Department of Parks, Recreation and Forestry and Fathers' Support Center. The goal of the program is to establish relationships between young men and police officers while providing healthy exercise and teaching life skills. Hundreds of young men have participated in ARCHS' Basketball/Life Skills program which has provided hundreds of hours of life skills training (financial, health, leadership topics) and recreational activities.

Partners

Funding partners
ARCHS funders can be federal, state, or local government. In addition ARCHS receives funding from private corporations as well. Many of ARCHS' funders have turned to ARCHS to execute national demonstration projects that have yielded important educational and social research outcomes. Since 1998, the following federal, state, local and private organizations have entrusted ARCHS with millions of dollars in funds to stamp a positive impact for Greater St. Louis: 
Anheuser-Busch/InBev
Children's Trust Fund of Missouri
City of St. Louis Parks and Recreation
City of St. Louis, Missouri
Civic Progress
Danforth Foundation
Deaconess Foundation
Herbert and Adrian Woods Foundation
Lutheran Foundation of St. Louis
Norman J. Stupp Foundation
State of Missouri
St. Louis Mental Health Board
United States Department of Justice
United States Department of Labor
United States Environmental Protection Agency

Impact
ARCHS had a $17.3 million impact on the region for FY 2013. Within that number, $6 million were grants and other revenues, and $11.3 million were funds provided by ARCHS' program partners, which includes 18,000 volunteer hours.

References

External links 
 ARCHS Home Page
 U.S. Environmental Protection Agency
 St. Louis Business Journal
 St. Louis Beacon
 St. Louis American
 STL Today
 St. Louis Commerce Magazine
 Missouri Department of Social Services

Organizations based in St. Louis